"Surprise" is a song by American singer Chlöe. It was released on June 17, 2022, through Parkwood Entertainment. An accompanying music video, directed by Diana Kunst, was released alongside the song.

Background and release 
In 2021, Bailey released her debut solo single, "Have Mercy". She released her second single, "Treat Me", in April 2022.

In May 2022, Bailey held an Instagram Live to choose which song she would release as the third single from her album. The three options were "For the Night", "Cheat Back", and "Surprise". On June 15, announced that she had chosen "Surprise" as the third single, and that it would release in two days. The song was picked to be released by Beyoncé, who founded Parkwood Entertainment, despite the song not being the fan-favorite. The song was released on June 17. The song's cover artwork showcases the singer lying face down on top of a pillow, without a shirt.

Composition 
"Surprise" is a steamy, R&B-leaning song. Bailey sings over a heavy bass beat and a "video-game esque sound effect". The song was produced by Scott Storch.

Music video 
The music video for "Surprise" was directed by Diana Kunst. It includes intimate scenes between the singer and a male love interest, who is played by American model and actor Broderick Hunter. She also dances in a Balenciaga underwear set. At the end of the video, it is revealed that the intimate scenes were made up in the man's mind.

Live performances 
On June 26, 2022, Bailey performed "Surprise" in a medley with "Treat Me" at the 2022 BET Awards.

Credits 
Credits adapted from Spotify.

 Chloe Bailey – performer, songwriter
 Scott Storch – producer, songwriter
 Illa – producer
 Ray Fraser – songwriter
 Feli Ferraro – songwriter

Charts

References 

2022 songs
Chloe Bailey songs
Songs written by Chloe Bailey